Henry Tucker may refer to:

Henry Tucker (of The Grove) (1713–1787), Southampton Parish, Bermuda merchant, politician, militia officer, and co-conspirator in St. George's gunpowder theft
Henry Tucker (President of the Council of Bermuda) (1742–1800), St. George's, Bermuda politician, President of Council of Bermuda, acting Governor of Bermuda
Sir Henry Tucker (Bermudian politician) (1903–1986), first Premier of Bermuda
Henry Tucker (Sherbro), merchant in Sherbro, Sierra Leone
Henry Holcombe Tucker (1819–1889), Chancellor of the University of Georgia, of Bermudian descent
Henry St George Tucker (financier) (1771–1851), Bermudian financier and official of the East India Company
Henry St. George Tucker Sr. (1780–1848), U.S. Representative from Virginia
Henry Tucker (colonial storekeeper) (1793–1850), Royal Navy officer and colonial storekeeper in the colony of New Zealand
Henry St. George Tucker Jr. (1828–1863), son of Henry St. George Tucker Sr., after whom St. George, West Virginia is named
Henry St. George Tucker III (1853–1932), U.S. Representative from Virginia
Henry St. George Tucker (bishop) (1874–1959), Bishop of the Episcopal Church in the United States
Henry W. Tucker (1919–1942), U.S. sailor for whom the USS Henry W. Tucker was named

See also
USS Henry W. Tucker, and USS Henry W. Tucker (DE-377), United States Navy ships